Bertrand Ngapounou (born 20 November 1982) is a Cameroonian former football defender.

Club career
Ngapounou played in his native country, Russia, Lithuania, Kazakhstan and Romania. He had a spell with FC Rostov in the Russian Premier League during 2003 and 2004.

References

External links
 
 
 
 

1982 births
Living people
Cameroonian footballers
Cameroonian expatriate footballers
FC Rostov players
FC Anzhi Makhachkala players
FK Žalgiris players
ASC Oțelul Galați players
Expatriate footballers in Russia
Expatriate footballers in Lithuania
Expatriate footballers in Romania
Expatriate footballers in Kazakhstan
Cameroonian expatriate sportspeople in Romania
Russian Premier League players
Liga I players
A Lyga players
Association football defenders
FC Okzhetpes players
FK Tauras Tauragė players
FK Vėtra players